The 1977 Indian Open was a men's tennis tournament played on outdoor clay courts in Bombay, India. It was the fifth edition of the tournament and was held from 28 November through 4 December 1977. The tournament was part of the 1 Star tier of the Grand Prix tennis circuit. Second-seeded Vijay Amritraj won the singles title, his third at the event after 1973 and 1975.

Finals

Singles
 Vijay Amritraj defeated  Terry Moor 7–6, 6–4 
 It was Amritraj's 2nd singles title of the year and the 10th of his career.

Doubles
 Mike Cahill /  Terry Moor defeated  Marcello Lara /  Jasjit Singh 6–7, 6–4, 6–4

References

External links
 International Tennis Federation (ITF) tournament edition details

Indian Open
1977 in Indian tennis